Tsam may refer to:

 Cham Albanians, a sub-group of Albanians in the northwestern Greece
 Cham dance, named tsam in Mongolian
 There's Something About Mary, a 1998 American romantic comedy film
 Tivoli Service Automation Manager, the Cloud management package from IBM
 Herzl Yankl Tsam (1835–1915), Jewish cantonist in the Russian Empire